Strong Words, Softly Spoken is the second full length studio album by Tony Lucca released in 1997 and Re-issued in 1999.

Album information
This album marks the second album Lucca released as an independent artist. Former MMC co-star Dale Godboldo sings background on the track "Kind" and Lucca's cousin Coal Garlak plays electric guitar, six string and acoustic guitar on "After All" and "Make It Alright".

Track listing
All songs written by Tony Lucca.
"Honestly For You" – 5:08
"Melancholy Collar" – 3:32
"Too Late" – 5:29
"It's You" – 3:29
"Hold You Tonight" – 5:00
"Dublin Blue" – 4:37
"After All" – 5:23
"Make It Alright" – 4:14
"Crown Love King" – 4:16
"Kind" – 2:49
"The Only One" – 4:57
"Honestly For You (Reprise)" - 2:16

Personnel
 Tony Lucca - lead and background vocals, acoustic and electric guitars, piano, rhodes and percussion
 Coal Garlak - electric guitar, six string moodygroove on "After All", and acoustic guitar on "Make It Alright"
 Todd Sickafoose - electric and acoustic bass
 Michael Barsimanto - drums
 Guenevere Measham - cello on "Dublin Blue"
 Briana Ackerman - viola on "Dublin Blue"
 Kristen Autry - violin on "Dublin Blue"
 C.C. White - vocal on "The Only One"
 Kathrin Shor - background vocal on "Kind"
 Dale Godboldo - background vocal on "Kind"
 Chaz Smith - petal steel on "Dublin Blue"
 Marc Worden - Photography artwork
 Mimi Archie - Graphic Design

1997 albums
Tony Lucca albums